The year 1659 in science and technology involved some significant events.

Astronomy
 Christiaan Huygens publishes Systema Saturnium, including the first illustration of the Orion Nebula.

Mathematics
 First known use of the term Abscissa, by Stefano degli Angeli.
 Swiss mathematician Johann Rahn publishes Teutsche Algebra, containing the first printed use of the 'division sign' (÷, a repurposed obelus variant) as a mathematical symbol for division and of the 'therefore sign' (∴).

Medicine
 Thomas Willis publishes De Febribus.

Physics
 Christiaan Huygens derives the formula for centripedal force.

Births
 February 27 – William Sherard, English botanist (died 1728)
 June 3 – David Gregory, Scottish astronomer (died 1708)

Deaths
 October 10 – Abel Tasman, Dutch explorer (born 1603)

References

 
17th century in science
1650s in science